Syarhey Sakharuk (born 25 September 1982) is a retired Belarusian professional footballer.

External links

Profile at teams.by

1982 births
Living people
People from Pruzhany
Sportspeople from Brest Region
Association football goalkeepers
Belarusian footballers
FC Dynamo Brest players
FC Volna Pinsk players
FC Kommunalnik Slonim players